Suntrana was an unincorporated community in eastern Denali Borough, Alaska, United States. It is located within the census-designated place of Healy.

It lies off the George Parks Highway south of the city of Anderson, and on the northeastern edge of Denali National Park and Preserve.  Its elevation is 1,463 feet (446 m).  Located along the right bank of the Healy River, Suntrana lies 3½ miles (5½ km) east of Healy, the county seat of the Denali Borough.

The town and mine at Suntrana no longer exist, the site of company housing is now mostly reforested, and little of the mine, power house or old tipple complex remains.

Demographics

Suntrana first appeared on the 1940 U.S. Census as an unincorporated village. In 1980, it was made a census-designated place (CDP). In 1990, the CDP was dissolved and was attached to Healy CDP.

References

Mining communities in Alaska
Unincorporated communities in Alaska
Unincorporated communities in Denali Borough, Alaska